Lourosa is a Portuguese civil parish (Pt.freguesia) and a city (Pt.cidade), located in the municipality of Santa Maria da Feira. The population in 2011 was 8,636, in an area of 5.77 km2. Lourosa obtained city status in 2001.

References

Freguesias of Santa Maria da Feira